Marinelli Glacier is a tidewater glacier located in Alberto de Agostini National Park, Isla Grande de Tierra del Fuego. The glacier spills out from the backbone of the Cordillera Darwin and calves into Ainsworth Bay, an embayment of the Almirantazgo Fjord. The Marinelli Glacier is in a state of retreat, beginning at least as early as 1960 and continuing to the present time.
Meltwater of Marinelli glacier discharges to form the headwaters of Marinelli Creek.

See also
Retreat of glaciers since 1850

Line notes

References

 B.L. Boyda, J.B. Andersona, J.S. Wellnerb and R.A. Fernández (2008) "The sedimentary record of glacial retreat, Marinelli," Marine Geology Fjord, Patagonia: Regional Correlations and Climate ties, Volume 255, Issues 3–4, 5 December 2008, Pages 165-178
C. Michael Hogan. 2008 Bahia Wulaia Dome Middens, Megalithic Portal, ed. Andy Burnham	

Glaciers of Magallanes Region
Isla Grande de Tierra del Fuego